Stratford Square Mall is a shopping mall that opened on March 9, 1981, in Bloomingdale, Illinois, a northwestern suburb of Chicago, Illinois, United States. The  The mall has 1 anchor store: Kohl's. There are 6 vacant anchor stores that were last occupied by JCPenney, Carson Pirie Scott, Sears, Round One, Century Theatres, and Burlington. The former Marshall Fields/Macy's space was demolished in 2019 to make way for a new Woodman's Food Market grocery store building. The mall is managed and owned by Namdar Realty Group.

History
Stratford Square Mall opened in 1981.

The 1990s began the start of considerable change. Nearby Woodfield Mall in Schaumburg completed a renovation and expansion, gaining the top spot in consumers' minds for the region. First, Woodfield Mall completed an overhaul and expansion in 1996, adding many new stores and a new two-level wing featuring a Nordstrom. Following that expansion, Woodfield's market dominance has continued to today.  Woodfield's dominance can also be attributed to a centralized location in Chicago's northwest suburbs, located near the intersection of Interstates 90 and 290.

On November 15, 1999, the mall completed a major renovation. It remained open and customers were able to continue shopping throughout the renovation. Improvements included new flooring throughout the center, a new elevator, additional escalators, enlarged restrooms including two family rooms, comfortable seating areas and an expanded retail area on the lower level. A new water display in the floor was a major focal point of center court. The original water displays next to the food court ran from the 2nd floor to a Mezzanine and then down to the 1st floor. The theater was behind it on the top floor and the mezzanine. It was removed because it was leaking from behind and was too costly to repair. Over time, it was reduced and eliminated being replaced with a Record Town and then changed to FYE store. Entrances would be more visible with the addition of enhanced signage and lighting, and automatic doors would be available at each mall entrance.

New York-based Feldman Mall Properties acquired Stratford Square Mall in early 2005.  A Steve and Barry's also operated at the mall from about 2006 until 2009, until that chain folded as well. The company renovated the four-screen movie theater into a Cinemark Century Theater, which opened on July 4, 2007. It now has 16 all-digital screens, a cappuccino bar, marble flooring, and stadium seating. After the movie theater renovation, a Red Robin restaurant was added next to the theater in 2008. In October 2011, the computerized fountain in the central square next to the food court was replaced by a carousel, which was later relocated to the lower level of the Burlington Coat Factory wing in front of Round One and Finish Line, Inc., then finally removed in its entirety sometime between 2018 and 2019. In early 2012, the second floor hallway entrance of the Burlington Coat Factory was blocked off and the second floor was closed to customers other than the restrooms on the 2nd floor.

In late October 2014, Red Robin officials stated their plan to remodel their restaurant to introduce their new "Gourmet Burgers and Brews" concept, which would feature both indoor and outdoor seating. In 2015, Round One, an entertainment center that includes bowling, karaoke, arcade games, billiards, darts and ping pong, opened on the lower level of the Carson's wing.

Wieboldt's became JCPenney in 1988 shortly after Wieboldt's went bankrupt in 1987. In early 2014, Stratford Square was acquired by StreetMac LLC. On January 15, 2014, JCPenney announced that its store would be closing as part of a plan to close 33 stores nationwide. The store closed on May 3, 2014. Marshall Field's was converted to Macy's in 2006. On January 4, 2017, Macy's was announced that they would also be closing as part of a plan to close 68 stores nationwide. The store closed on March 26, 2017. On April 18, 2018, Carson's announced that they would be closing as well as parent company The Bon-Ton was going out of business. The store closed on August 29, 2018. None of the remaining anchors are original to Stratford Square - Burlington Coat Factory opened in 2002 and was originally a Montgomery Ward, which closed in 2001 due to their bankruptcy; Kohl's was originally a MainStreet built in 1985, which converted into Kohl's in 1988; and the Sears was added in 1990.

Later in June 2018, the mall announced that Woodman's Food Market would demolish the Macy's building and 30ft of the mall and build a new store with no mall entrance. A 25 West Brewery opened later that year as part of a plan to change the tenant mix to 40% retail / 60% entertainment and dining. 25 West closed in February 2020 after a contract dispute with Namdar.

On August 6, 2019, it was announced that Sears would be closing this location as part of a plan to close 26 stores nationwide. The store closed on November 10, 2019. This leaves Burlington Coat Factory and Kohl's as the only traditional anchors left.

On October 10, 2019, Namdar Realty Group acquired the mall.

In 2020, More stores inside the mall were closing including Victoria's Secret, The 25 West Brewery, Oriental Gifts, Express, Scooby's hot dogs and more. Round One closed on October 11, 2020.

Because of COVID restrictions, the Kohl's anchor became no longer accessible from the interior of the mall, only accessible using the lower level parking lot nearest to the Woodman's Food Market that demolished the Macy's building and that also has no mall entrance. As of July 2021, both upper and lower entrances to Kohl's have been reopened and you can now access the store from inside the mall. As of October 2020, the theater has moved out. Woodman's Food Market opened its doors August 11, 2021.

On February 25, 2022, Burlington Coat Factory announced that they would be relocating from the mall into the former Kmart across the street on Gary Ave on February 24, 2023, next to TJ Maxx. This leaves Kohl's as the last traditional anchor store remaining.

Several projects have been filmed in the mall. In 2018 and 2019 the HBO show Righteous Gemstones was filmed in parts of the mall, in 2020 HBO filmed in several store locations within the mall, including Bull and Bear Axe Throwing. In May 2022, The Illinois State Lottery filmed a commercial inside the mall.

As of recent, there have been calls for ‘re-envisioning’ Stratford Square Mall from Bloomingdale Village President, Franco Coladipietro. The Village President is calling for the demolition of the “vacant eyesore” mall and replacing it with street-level retail and restaurants with surrounding residential buildings. As of September 1, 2022, no official demolition plans have been released nor has the mall officially closed.

The Burlington space closed on February 5, 2023, as it has relocated across the street at Stratford Crossing.

References

External links
 

Shopping malls in DuPage County, Illinois
Shopping malls established in 1981
Bloomingdale, Illinois
1981 establishments in Illinois
Namdar Realty Group